Steve Nemeth (born February 11, 1967) is a Canadian retired ice hockey player. He played 12 NHL games for the New York Rangers. He was part of the Canadian team that was disqualified from the 1987 World Juniors for their involvement in the Punch-up in Piestany.

Nemeth was singled out as one of the players who did not fight. However, Nemeth had been involved on-ice attempting to break up various fights, and was the only Canadian to intervene when forward Stephane Roy was double-teamed by two Soviet players.

Nemeth consulted with tournament officials regarding the response to the brawl, and was told to have the players go to the locker room and await further instructions.  Nemeth was the only player to challenge the initial suspension handed out by the International Ice Hockey Federation to the players involved in the brawl. The suspensions were initially to last through the end of the 1987-88 season. It was Nemeth's hope to remain eligible to play for Team Canada at the 1988 Olympics, but, although the suspensions would later be reduced to six months, Nemeth would not make the team.

Nemeth was born in Calgary, Alberta. He played his junior hockey for the Lethbridge Broncos and Kamloops Blazers.

External links

1967 births
Living people
Canadian ice hockey centres
Canadian people of Hungarian descent
Ice hockey people from Calgary
New York Rangers draft picks
New York Rangers players
Tacoma Sabercats players